William Folwell may refer to:

 William Watts Folwell (1833–1929), educator, writer and historian; president of the University of Minnesota
 William H. Folwell (born 1924), American Episcopal bishop